Alexander Hacke (also known as Alexander von Borsig, Alex Hacke, Hacke, born 11 October 1965) is a guitarist, bass guitarist, singer, musician, record producer, writer and filmmaker from Germany. He is primarily known as a longtime member of the influential German industrial music group Einstürzende Neubauten.

Hacke has released two full-length solo albums, and has also collaborated with many other artists, such as Robert Rutman, The Tiger Lillies, Danielle de Picciotto, FM Einheit, Crime & the City Solution, Phew, Gianna Nannini, Gry, Miranda Sex Garden, Terranova, Sprung Aus Den Wolken, Wovenhand, David Yow, Mona Mur, Die Ichs, Schlaflose Naechte, Fred Alpi and others.

Biography

Early years 
In the early 1980s he released a few solo tapes and mini-albums, such as Hiroshima. He became a long-time member of Einstürzende Neubauten and also was a member of several other bands, such as Sentimentale Jugend (with Christiane Vera Felscherinow, also known as Christiane F.), Sprung Aus Den Wolken and Mona Mur.

Einstürzende Neubauten 

In 1980, at the age of fifteen, he joined Einstürzende Neubauten, which had been formed earlier the same year. Hacke played guitar and worked with the band's sound until the mid 1990s. Then he changed from guitar to bass and is now a bass player and, according to band leader Blixa Bargeld, "a musical director of the band".

Solo activities 
Hacke's first full-length solo album was Filmarbeiten (1992).

In the 1990s he was frontman of the band Jever Mountain Boys, who played their favorite songs, particularly country music cover-versions.

In 2003 Alexander Hacke and his longtime partner Danielle de Picciotto (married since 2006) organized the monthly event "BadaBing" in the famous Berlin 70s Club "Big Eden", presenting new and unusual bands and in this way initiating a new wave of Berlin-oriented "Futur-electroclash" music all over Europe. They travel extensively performing multimedia shows together and presenting workshops on Berlin underground culture. In 2004, Danielle de Picciotto produced a documentary on Einstürzende Neubauten for which Alexander Hacke did the sound design.

In 2005 Hacke and de Picciotto conceived and directed "The Mountains of Madness", an audio/visual live show based on stories by H. P. Lovecraft, inviting the English Trio The Tiger Lillies to participate and perform in the successful production throughout Europe.

In the 2000s Hacke created the album Sanctuary (released in 2005), travelling with a mobile recorder in Europe and North America and collaborating with numerous artists, such as J.G.Thirlwell (Foetus), Caspar Brötzmann, Larry Mullins (Toby Dammit), Vinnie Signorelli (Unsane), Michael Evans (KBZ 200), Sugarpie Jones (Celebrity Skin), Bob Rutman (Steel Cello Ensemble), Nils Wohlrabe (The Leather Nun), Gianna Nannini, Andrew Chudy (alias N.U. Unruh, Einstürzende Neubauten), Lary 7 (The Analog Society), and David Yow (The Jesus Lizard). In the reviews on this album Hacke was compared to Frank Zappa and Captain Beefheart. The "Road Record", an excerpt of which can be seen on Sanctuary, was documented by de Picciotto, describing the revolutionary recording style Hacke used to produce the record.

Hacke also contributed to several soundtracks to such films as Sonnenallee and Das Wilde Leben (biography of Uschi Obermaier, 2006/07). Hacke produced music for Fatih Akın's film Head-On (2004) and is a main character in Crossing the Bridge: The Sound of Istanbul (2005), Akın's documentary of the Istanbul music scene.

On several occasions he reunited on stage with FM Einheit (ex-Einstürzende Neubauten) for an experimental performance.

Private life 
Alexander Hacke's first noteworthy girlfriend was Christiane F., who became famous with the internationally acclaimed movie and book Wir Kinder vom Bahnhof Zoo, a biography of her heroin addiction. They performed together in Europe and the US with their band Sentimentale Jugend and also appeared together in the movie Decoder in 1983.

On 3 October 1989, Hacke's son Joshua was born in Berlin. His mother is Angela Mettbach, a Berlin nightlife figure who had a short-lived musical career with her band Octopussy.

Hacke was briefly married to German actress and singer Meret Becker and was involved in her musical career. Becker guested on Einstürzende Neubauten's album Ende Neu. In 2006, Hacke married his longtime partner Danielle de Picciotto, an American Berlin-based multimedia artist who is known for having founded the Berlin Love Parade together with Dr Motte and for singing in the band Space Cowboys.

Solo discography 

 1980: Das Leben ist schön
 1981: Borsig-Werke
 1982: Christiane F.: Wunderbar (Mitarbeit)
 1982: Hiroshima
 1982: Mona Mur und die Mieter: Jeszcze Polska
 1988: Crime and the City Solution: Shine
 1989: Crime and the City Solution: The Bride Ship
 1990: Crime and the City Solution: Paradise Discotheque
 1992: Phew: Our Likeness (Musiker)
 1992: Filmarbeiten
 1994: Jever Mountain Boys: Bury the Bottle with Me
 1994: Gianna Nannini: Dispetto (Mitarbeit)
 1994: Die Haut: Sweat (Mitarbeit)
 1995: Blind: Live Saver (Produzent)
 1995: Miranda Sex Garden: Fairytales About Slavery (Produzent)
 1998: Meret Becker: Nachtmahr (Produzent, Musiker)
 1999: Terranova: Close the Door (Mitarbeit)
 2001: Fieber – Tagebuch eines Aussätzigen, Gedichte von Klaus Kinski, rezitiert von Ben Becker, Musik von Alexander Hacke
 2002: Fred Alpi: Les chiens mangent les chiens (Produzent)
 2005: Sanctuary
 2005: Martin Dean: The Best of Martin Dean (Mitarbeit)
 2006: Mountains of Madness together with Tiger Lillies & Danielle de Picciotto (DVD)
 2006: "I Hate You" for the Monks-Tribute-CD Silver Monk Time
 2008: "The Ship of Fools" in collaboration with Danielle de Picciotto (DVD/CD)
 2009: "Doomed"
 2010: "Hitman's Heel" in collaboration with Danielle de Picciotto
 2013: "American Twilight" Crime & The City Solution, MUTE Records
 2014: "Ministry of Wolves" in collaboration with Mick Harvey, Danielle de Picciotto, 
 2016: "Perseverantia" Album; CD/LP collaboration with Danielle de Picciotto
 2017: "Unity" Mediatation Album, CD Collaboration with Danielle de Picciotto
 2018: "Menetekel" Album; CD/LP collaboration hackedepicciotto
 2018: "Joy" Mediatation Album, CD Collaboration hackedepicciotto with Eric Hubel and Vincent Signorelli

For discography of Alexander Hacke with Einstürzende Neubauten, see: Einstürzende Neubauten's discography (all releases).

Film soundtracks 

 1988 Nihil, oder alle Zeit der Welt, directed by Uli M Schueppel
 1990 A Priori, directed by Uli M Schueppel
 1992 Vaterland, directed by Uli M Schueppel, together with Mick Harvey
 2000 Planet Alex, directed by Uli M Schueppel, together with Mick Harvey
 2004: Gegen die Wand (Filmmusik), Regie: Fatih Akın
 2005: Crossing The Bridge: The Sound Of Istanbul (Dokumentarfilm), Regie: Fatih Akın
 2007: Das wilde Leben, Regie: Achim Bornhak
 2007: Fuori dalle corde, Regie: Fulvio Bernasconi
 2009: Elektrokohle - Von Wegen (Darsteller und Filmmusik), Regie: Uli M Schueppel
 2009: , Regie: Esther Gronenborn
 2009: Last Cowboy Standing, Regie: Zaida Bergroth
 2010: Empire Me - Der Staat bin Ich!, Regie: Paul Poet
 2011: Lollipop Monster, Regie: Ziska Riemann
 2012: Polluting Paradise, Regie: Fatih Akin
 2015: The Cut, Regie: Fatih Akin
 2018: "Iuventa" Regie: Michele Cinque, together with Danielle de Picciotto
 2018: "Zersetzt" Regie: HansJörg Thurn, together with Danielle de Picciotto

DVD 
2006 The Mountains of Madness (with The Tiger Lillies and Danielle de Picciotto)
2008 Ship Of Fools (with Danielle de Picciotto)
2009 "In Berlin" Documentary by Michael Ballhaus and Ciro Cappellary
2010 How Long is Now (with Danielle de Picciotto)

References

External links 
 Officiel site
 
 

1965 births
Living people
Musicians from Berlin
German electronic musicians
German industrial musicians
German rock bass guitarists
Male bass guitarists
Einstürzende Neubauten members
German experimental musicians
Alternative rock bass guitarists
Crime & the City Solution members
German male guitarists